The 3rd Armoured Division was formed on 2 July 1956 in Hamburg and was one of the first major formations of the new German Army or Bundeswehr after the Second World War. The 3rd Armoured Division was stationed on the North German Plain between the rivers Elbe and Weser. Its last headquarters location was Buxtehude. It was part of the I Corps alongside the 1st Panzer, 7th Panzer, and 11th Panzergrenadier Divisions.

The 3rd Armoured Division was disbanded on 30 September 1994. Its last commander was Generalmajor Gerd Schultze-Rhonhof.

In the 1980s under Army Structures III and IV the division consisted of the 7th Panzergrenadier Brigade, 8th Panzer Brigade, and the Panzerlehrbrigade 9 (Armoured demonstration brigade). After the division's disbandment 9 PzL Bde eventually became part of 1st Armoured Division (Germany).

Operations 
The Division provided support to numerous disasters, e. g. during serious floods in North Germany in 1962 and 1976 as well as the flooding of the Elbe Lateral Canal. In January 1979 elements of the Division were deployed during the emergency caused by heavy snowfall in North Germany.

In 1993 parts of the Division were deployed to Somalia as part of UNOSOM II.

Divisional Organization 1989 
 3rd Panzer Division, Buxtehude
 Staff Company, 3rd Panzer Division, Buxtehude
 7th Panzergrenadier Brigade, Hamburg
 Staff Company, 1st Panzergrenadier Brigade, Hamburg, (8x M577, 8x Luchs)
 71st Panzergrenadier Battalion (Reserve), Hamburg, (13x Leopard 1A5, 24x Marder, 12x M113)
 72nd Panzergrenadier Battalion, Hamburg, (24x Marder, 6x Panzermörser, 23x M113)
 73rd Panzergrenadier Battalion, Cuxhaven, (24x Marder, 6x Panzermörser, 23x M113)
 74th Panzer Battalion, Cuxhaven, (41x Leopard 2, 12x M113)
 75th Panzer Artillery Battalion, Hamburg, (18x M109A3G)
 70th Anti-Tank Company, Cuxhaven, (12x Jaguar 2)
 70th Armored Engineer Company, Stade
 70th Supply Company, Stade
 70th Maintenance Company, Stade
 8th Panzer Brigade, Lüneburg
 Staff Company, 8th Panzer Brigade, Lüneburg, (8x M577, 8x Luchs)
 81st Panzer Battalion (Reserve), Lüneburg, (28x Leopard 2, 11x Marder, 12x M113)
 82nd Panzergrenadier Battalion, Lüneburg, (35x Marder, 6x Panzermörser, 12x M113)
 83rd Panzer Battalion, Lüneburg, (41x Leopard 2, 12x M113)
 84th Panzer Battalion, Lüneburg, (41x Leopard 2, 12x M113)
 85th Panzer Artillery Battalion, Lüneburg, (18x M109A3G)
 80th Anti-Tank Company, Lüneburg, (12x Jaguar 1)
 80th Armored Engineer Company, Lüneburg
 80th Supply Company, Lüneburg
 80th Maintenance Company, Lüneburg
 9th Panzer (Lehr) Brigade, Munster
 Staff Company, 9th Panzerlehrbrigade, Munster, (8x M577, 8x Luchs)
 91st Panzer (Lehr) Battalion (Reserve), Munster, (28x Leopard 2, 11x Marder, 12x M113)
 92nd Panzergrenadier (Lehr) Battalion, Munster, (35x Marder, 6x Panzermörser, 12x M113)
 93rd Panzer (Lehr) Battalion, Munster, (41x Leopard 2, 12x M113)
 94th Panzer (Lehr) Battalion, Munster, (41x Leopard 2, 12x M113)
 95th Panzer (Lehr) Artillery Battalion, Munster, (18x M109A3G)
 90th Anti-Tank (Lehr) Company, Munster, (12x Jaguar 1)
 90th Armored Engineer (Lehr) Company, Munster
 90th Supply (Lehr) Company, Munster
 90th Maintenance (Lehr) Company, Munster
 3rd Artillery Regiment, Stade
 Staff Battery, 3rd Artillery Regiment, Stade
 31st Field Artillery Battalion, Lüneburg, (18x M110A2, 18x FH-70)
 32nd Rocket Artillery Battalion, Dörverden, (16x LARS)
 33rd Surveillance Battalion, Stade, (12x CL89)
 3rd Infantry Battery, Dörverden
 3rd Armored Reconnaissance Battalion, Lüneburg, (34x Leopard 1, 10x Luchs, 18x Fuchs - 9 of which carry a RASIT radar)
 3rd Air Defense Regiment, Hamburg, (36x Gepard)
 3rd Engineer Battalion, Stade, (8x Biber AVLB, 8x Pionierpanzer 1, 4x Skorpion Mine Layers, 12x Floating Bridge Modules)
 3rd Army Aviation Squadron, Rotenburg, (10x Alouette II)
 3rd Signal Battalion, Buxtehude
 3rd Medical Battalion (Reserve), Hamburg
 3rd Supply Battalion (Reserve), Stade
 3rd Maintenance Battalion (Reserve), Rotenburg
 5x Field Replacement Battalions: 31st and 32nd in Zeven, 33rd and 35th in Verden, 34th in Neustadt am Achim
 36th Jäger Battalion (Reserve), Zeven
 37th Jäger Battalion (Reserve), Munster
 38th Security Battalion (Reserve), Zeven

Commanders

External links 

 The 3rd Armoured Division of the Bundeswehr at www.relikte.com
 The history of the Division in the Federal Archive

3
20th century in Hamburg
Military units and formations disestablished in 1994
Military units and formations established in 1956
1950s in Hamburg